Madlyn Cazalis is an African organic cosmetic company founded by entrepreneur Christian Ngan, in 2012.

Madlyn Cazalis designs, manufactures, transports natural beauty products and operates in Central Africa with more than 200 distributors (pharmacies, beauty institutes and supermarkets), 100 brand ambassadors and customers in more than 12 countries.

The company was founded to prevent Africans from using bleaching products, by encouraging local natural hand-made cosmetics such as body lotions, scrubs, masks and soaps. 

The company received many accolades. In September 2015, Madlyn Cazalis was listed among the Top 50 most innovative African Start-ups by The New York Forum, Le Point and France 24.

In 2016, Madlyn Cazalis was Finalist of the Total Startupper of the Year Challenge.

References 

Cosmetics companies of Cameroon